The National People's Congress Overseas Chinese Affairs Committee is one of nine special committees of the National People's Congress, the national legislature of the People's Republic of China. The special committee was created during the first session of the 6th National People's Congress in June 1983, and has existed for every National People's Congress since.

Chairpersons

References

Overseas Chinese Affairs Committee